Henk Walk is a Dutch former football coach who is last known to have managed the Bhutan national football team from 2002 to 2003.

Bhutan national football team

Henk Walk was hired as Bhutan's national football team coach in October 2002 before the 2003 SAFF Championship. Walk was said to have improved the young squad; however, when the Dutchman took them to their first fixture in the 2003 SAFF Championship, they were defeated 6-0 by the Maldives.

References 

Expatriate football managers in Bhutan
Bhutan national football team managers
Dutch football managers
Dutch expatriate football managers
Year of birth missing (living people)
Living people